Rushcutters Bay is a harbourside inner-east suburb of Sydney, in the state of New South Wales, Australia 3 kilometres east of the Sydney central business district, in the local government area of the City of Sydney.

The suburb of Rushcutters Bay sits beside the bay it takes its name from, on Sydney Harbour. It is surrounded by the suburbs of Elizabeth Bay, Darlinghurst, Paddington and Darling Point. Kings Cross is a locality on the western border.

History
After British settlement, the area was first known as 'Rush Cutting Bay' because the swampy land was covered in tall rushes used by early settlers for thatching houses. In 1878,  were reserved for recreation; and, after reclamation work was completed, Rushcutters Bay Park was created, bounded by New South Head Road and the bay at Sydney Harbour.

Rushcutters Bay was once the site of the famous Sydney Stadium. On Boxing Day 1908 at the Stadium, Tommy Burns lost his heavyweight title to the legendary Jack Johnson, famously the first African-American to win a world title. For many years Rushcutters Bay was home to White City Stadium for major tennis tournaments, prior to the establishment of tennis facilities at Sydney Olympic Park.

On 6 April 1927, Herbert Pratten, Federal Minister for Trade, appeared in a Lee DeForest film to celebrate the opening of a Phonofilm studio in Rushcutters Bay.

In the 20th century, when neighbouring Darlinghurst was seen as down-at-heel, some businesses and residents abutting that boundary would, for appearance’s sake, list their addresses as being in Rushcutters Bay. This phenomenon persists despite Darlinghurst’s gentrification; for example, a BMW dealership on Craigend Street, Darlinghurst, provides customers with an incorrect address.

The bay at Sydney Harbour served as host for the sailing events during the 2000 Summer Olympics.

Heritage listings 
Rushcutters Bay has a number of heritage-listed sites, including:
 Rushcutters Bay Park: Rushcutters Bay Sewage Pumping Station

Demographics
According to the 2021 census, there were 2,335 people living in Rushcutters Bay.

Of these: 
 Age distribution: Residents had a similar range of ages to the country overall, except for notably fewer children.  The median age was 37 years, the same as the national median. Children aged under 15 years made up 5.6% of the population (national average is 18.7%) and people aged 65 years and over made up 14.9% of the population (national average is 15.8%).
  Ethnic diversity : Just under half (48%) were born in Australia, compared to the national average of 67%; the next most common countries of birth were England 6.4%, New Zealand 3.9%, Brazil 1.8%, China (excludes SARs and Taiwan)	1.6% and India 1.6%.  At home, 65.5% of residents only spoke English; other languages spoken at home included Portuguese, 1.9%, Spanish 1.8%, French 1/7%, Mandarin 1.4% and Italian 1.0%.
 Finances: The median household weekly income was $1,372, compared to the national median of $1,234. This difference is also reflected in real estate, with the median mortgage payment being $2,050 per month, compared to the national median of $1,800.
 Transport: On the day of the 2011 Census, 33.1% of employed people traveled to work on public transport and 23.9% by car (either as driver or as passenger).
 Housing: The great majority (97.2%) of occupied private dwellings were flats, units or apartments, while 0.3% were separate houses, and 0.4% were semi-detached. 
 Religion: The most common religious affiliation was "No Religion" (41.0%); the next most common responses were Catholic 17.8%, Anglican 8.7% and Judaism 2.5%.

References

 
Venues of the 2000 Summer Olympics
Olympic sailing venues
Suburbs of Sydney
Bays of New South Wales
Fishing communities in Australia
New South Head Road, Sydney